Ryan Harty is an American writer.  His first book, Bring Me Your Saddest Arizona, was published in 2003 by University of Iowa Press. He is married to fellow writer Julie Orringer.

Overview
Harty grew up in Arizona and northern California and is a graduate of UC Berkeley and the Iowa Writers’ Workshop. He was a Stegner Fellow at Stanford University and the recipient of a Henfield-Transatlantic Review Award.

His stories have appeared in Tin House and The Missouri Review and have been anthologized in The 2003 Pushcart Prize and The Best American Short Stories 2003.

Literary works
  This book contains eight short stories:
 What Can I Tell You about My Brother?
 Ongchoma
 Between Tubac and Tumacacori
 Crossroads
 Sarah at the Palace
 Why the Sky Turns Red When the Sun Goes Down
 Don't Call It Christmas
 September

He won the John Simmons Short Fiction Award.

References

Living people
21st-century American novelists
American male novelists
Iowa Writers' Workshop alumni
University of California, Berkeley alumni
American male short story writers
21st-century American short story writers
21st-century American male writers
Stegner Fellows
Year of birth missing (living people)